Commissioner Creek is a stream in the U.S. state of Georgia. It is a tributary to the Oconee River.

The creek was named after a local Indian agent commissioner. A variant name is "Commissioners Creek".

References

Rivers of Georgia (U.S. state)
Rivers of Jones County, Georgia
Rivers of Wilkinson County, Georgia